Bioko Allen's bushbaby (Sciurocheirus alleni), also known as the Bioko squirrel galago, is a species of primate in the galago family found in Bioko, Equatorial Guinea. Its natural habitat is subtropical or tropical dry forests. The bushbaby is currently near-threatened, according to the International Union for Conservation of Nature.

Taxonomy 
Originally described as Galago alleni by Waterhouse (1838), the species was placed in a separate genus, Sciurocheirus by Gray in 1863. The species was split into three taxa, alleni, cameronensis, and gabonensis by Eisentraut (1973) and Groves (1989) which were then later elevated to species status by Groves (2001) as S. alleni, S. cameronensis, and S. gabonensis and followed by Groves (2005) and Nekaris (2013).

Physical description 

Further reading

References

Bioko Allen's bushbaby
Mammals of Cameroon
Mammals of Equatorial Guinea
Mammals of West Africa
Fauna of Bioko
Bioko Allen's bushbaby
Taxonomy articles created by Polbot